The Båstad Tennis Stadium is a tennis complex in Båstad, Sweden. Since its opening, the venue has been the host of the annual men's 250 series tournament, the Swedish Open. Since 2009, the venue has hosted the women's tournament. Båstad Tennis Stadium has a capacity of 5,000.

The history of the Båstad Tennis Stadium can be traced back to 1907, when the first tennis courts at what is known as Båstad Tennis Stadium were built. In 2001, the Båstad Tennis Stadium was renovated.

References

Outdoor arenas
Tennis venues in Sweden
1907 establishments in Sweden
Sports clubs established in 1907